Withania riebeckii is a species of plant in the family Solanaceae. It is endemic to Yemen.  Its natural habitats are subtropical or tropical dry forests and subtropical or tropical dry shrubland.

References

riebeckii
Endemic flora of Socotra
Least concern plants
Taxonomy articles created by Polbot
Taxa named by Isaac Bayley Balfour
Taxa named by Georg August Schweinfurth